Tüdevtei is a sum of Zavkhan Province in western Mongolia. Sum centre is 17 km South of Oigon Lake. In 2005, its population was 2,003.

References 

Districts of Zavkhan Province